Vals is the word for waltz in many European languages.

Vals or VALS may also refer to:
 Peruvian waltz
 Venezuelan waltz
 Vals (dance), a dance related to Argentine tango
 VALS, "Values And Lifestyles," a psychographic segmentation tool

Places
Vals-les-Bains, France
Vals, Ariège, France
Vals, Switzerland
Vals, Austria
Vals River, South Africa

People
Eneli Vals (born 1991), Estonian footballer

Organisations
Victorian Aboriginal Legal Service (VALS), Melbourne, Australia